Arantxa Sánchez Vicario defeated the two-time defending champion Steffi Graf in the final, 7–6(8–6), 3–6, 7–5 to win the women's singles tennis title at the 1989 French Open. This ended Graf's winning streak of major singles titles at five. Graf served for the championship at 5–3 in the third set, but lost the game to love and won only three more points in the match from that point. Sánchez Vicario was just 17 years old at the time, and it was the first of her three French Open titles (followed by 1994 and 1998).

This tournament marked the major debut for future world No. 1 Monica Seles, who reached the semifinals before losing to Graf. It was also the first French Open since 1978 not to feature Martina Navratilova or Chris Evert.

Seeds

Qualifying

Draw

Finals

Top half

Section 1

Section 2

Section 3

Section 4

Bottom half

Section 5

Section 6

Section 7

Section 8

References

External links
1989 French Open – Women's draws and results at the International Tennis Federation

Women's Singles
French Open by year – Women's singles
French Open - Women's Singles
1989 in women's tennis
1989 in French women's sport